Rusizi is a district (akarere) in Western Province, Rwanda. Its capital is Cyangugu, the major city of the Rwandan south-west and the district contains large parts of the former Cyangugu Province.

Geography, flora and fauna 
The district lies at the southern end of Lake Kivu, where it empties into the Rusizi River (after which the district is named). Rusizi's capital, Cyangugu, is one of the three major Rwandan lake ports of Lake Kivu (along with Kibuye and Gisenyi) and it contiguous with the much larger Congolese city of Bukavu. The district also contains the western half of Nyungwe Forest, a popular tourist destination, being one of the last remaining forest areas of Rwanda and home to chimpanzees and many other species of primate.

Sectors 
Rusizi district is divided into 18 sectors (imirenge): Bugarama, Butare, Bweyeye, Gikundamvura, Gashonga, Giheke, Gihundwe, Gitambi, Kamembe, Muganza, Mururu, Nkanka, Nkombo, Nkungu, Nyakabuye, Nyakarenzo, Nzahaha, Rwimbogo.

Uniqueness of Rusizi district: 
A small town on the border with the DRC, with views across to the Congolese city of Bukavu.

Rusizi is the closest town to Nyungwe National Park, which is about an hour’s drive away. Budget accommodation here will appeal to self-drive visitors to the National Park.

References 

 
 Inzego.doc — Province, District and Sector information from MINALOC, the Rwanda ministry of local government.

 
Districts of Rwanda